Elizabeth Lee Mei Fung is a Hong Kong actress.

Filmography
 The Romancing Star 2 (1988) as Ching Po-chu (程寶珠)
 Picture Of A Nymph (1988)
 How to Pick Girls Up! (1988)
 He Who Chases After The Wind (1988)
 Gunmen (1988) as Mona Fong Siu-man
 The Greatest Lover (1988)
 The Yuppie Fantasia (1989) as Jenny, Foon's first love
 Web Of Deception (1989)
 Long Arm of the Law Part 3 (1989) as Seung Moon (常满)
 How To Be A Millionaire... Without Really Trying (1989)
 City Squeeze (1989)
 Blonde Fury (1989)
 All Night Long (1989)
 Widow Warriors (1990)
 Sunshine Friends (1990)
 Return Engagement (1990) as Tsim Siu-fung (錢小鳳)  
 Deadly Deal (1991) 
 Freedom Run Q (1992)
 The Sword Stained With Royal Blood (1993) as Wan Yee
 Love To Kill (1993)
 Underground Banker (1994)
 Organized Crime & Triad Bureau (1994)
 A Touch Of Evil (1995)
 The Trail of Love (1995) (TV series)
 Thunderstorm (1996)

References

External links
 

Living people
20th-century Hong Kong actresses
Year of birth missing (living people)
 Hong Kong expatriates in Taiwan